Snowboarding at the 2014 Winter Olympics in Sochi was held at the Rosa Khutor Extreme Park. The events were held between 6 and 22 February 2014. A total of ten snowboarding events were held at Sochi 2014 which include parallel giant slalom, snowboard cross, half-pipe, and the new events of parallel slalom and slopestyle.

A crash in practice from Norwegian slopestyle snowboarder Torstein Horgmo, who fractured his collarbone, and complaints from other athletes that some jumps were too steep  prompted organisers to modify the slopestyle course in the week before the Games.

Competition schedule

The following is the competition schedule for all ten events.

All times are (UTC+4).

Medal summary

Medal table

Men's events

Women's events

Qualification

A total of 252 quota spots were available to athletes to compete at the games. A maximum of 24 athletes could be entered by a National Olympic Committee, with a maximum of 14 men or 14 women. The five different events had different quota numbers allocated to them. Countries are allowed to enter the same athlete into more than one event, further reducing the number of athletes competing.

Participating nations
243 athletes from 31 nations participated, with number of athletes in parentheses. Croatia, Kazakhstan and Serbia made their Olympic debuts in the sport.

References

External links
Official Results Book – Snowboard

 
2014
Winter Olympics
Snowboarding